Thind is a last name and also a clan of the Kamboj caste group.

Surname
Notable people with the surname Thind, who may or may not have a connection to the clan, include:

 Balwant Singh Thind, finance minister of Punjab
 Bhagat Singh Thind, writer and immigrant to the USA
 Gurminder Thind, player of American football
 Hira Thind, Punjabi singer
 Kartar Singh Thind, botanist
 Sadhu Singh Thind, politician

References

Indian surnames
Hindu surnames
Punjabi-language surnames
Punjabi tribes